David Foster is a self-titled solo album by David Foster, released in 1986.  The album is mainly instrumental with two duet-style songs featuring rare vocals from Foster himself.  This work led to Foster receiving the Juno Award for "Instrumental Artist of the Year" in 1986 and 1987, and a Grammy Award nomination for "Best Pop Instrumental Performance" in 1986.  Co-producer Humberto Gatica was also nominated for a Grammy Award in 1986 for "Best Engineered Recording" for this album.

Background and writing

After producing numerous commercially successful albums for other artists during the 1980s, David Foster released his first major label debut in 1986.  The album features many of Foster's friends and collaborators from the Los Angeles-area studio musician scene who had worked with him on previous releases including his first solo album "The Best of Me" and the St. Elmo's Fire soundtrack.

The first track is the instrumental version of the "Love Theme" from the 1985 film St. Elmo's Fire, which also appears on the film's soundtrack.  Foster received a Juno Award for "Producer of the Year" for that album in 1986.  A video was produced for this song, featuring a storyline where Foster is writing the song on piano interspersed with scenes of him pursuing a girl riding on horseback.

The second track is from the 1985 Spielberg film The Color Purple.  The CD soundtrack for this film features a different track entitled "High Life/Proud Theme" (1:12), and it is not clear if this version actually appears in the movie.  The song was composed by award-winning producer Quincy Jones, his frequent co-writer Rod Temperton and arranger Jeremy Lubbock.  All three were nominated for the Academy Award for "Original Music Score" in 1985 for their work on this soundtrack.

The third track "Flight of the Snowbirds" is inspired by the Canadian Forces Snowbirds aerobatic flying team.  Foster was subsequently made an honorary member of the Snowbirds.

The fourth track, "All That My Heart Can Hold," would be covered with Spanish lyrics by singer Luis Miguel as "Ayer" (Yesterday). "Ayer" was the first single released from his Grammy-winning album, Aries, and was also a #1 hit in both Mexico and the US. It also would be covered by Wendy Moten from her album Time for Change, with lyrics written by Linda Thompson.

The fifth track "The Best of Me" is the first vocal song on the album featuring a duet between Olivia Newton-John and Foster.  The two had previously worked together on the 1983 Two of a Kind soundtrack, including the songs "Take a Chance" and "Shakin' You".  This soft rock single was a Top 10 hit on the Billboard AC charts in the U.S. and a Top 40 hit in Canada.  The accompanying music video features Newton-John and Foster singing and playfully spending time together in his home recording studio.  Foster's co-writers on this song are Jeremy Lubbock and Richard Marx who would provide background vocals on other Foster productions before becoming a major solo artist on his own.

The sixth track "tapDANCE" is from the 1985 film White Nights starring Gregory Hines.  Hines provides the tap dancing heard in this song, likely from a scene in the movie.

The seventh track "Who's Gonna Love You Tonight" is the second song featuring vocals, with Foster and Richard Page who is best known as the lead vocalist for Mr. Mister (of "Broken Wings" fame).  This pop rock-style song was written with well-known lyricist John Bettis and Keith Diamond.  The song was later briefly featured in the 1989 film, "Listen to Me." The song was also released as a single.

The instruments used in the recording of this album were considered cutting-edge technology at the time, including the newly invented synthaxe guitar, as well as host of synthesizers and sequencers including the Wendell Junior, Kurzweil, Fairlight, PPG Wave 2.3 with Waveterm, MIDI Minimoog, Roland Jupiter-8, Emulator 2, Yamaha DX Series, Yamaha 9 ft. grand piano with Jim Wilson MIDI system, Oberheim Matrix 12 and the Linn LM-1 drum machine with A.M.S.

Reception 
JA of Keyboard praised the album for its "impeccable production", but noted that only "tapDance" and "Playing With Fire" feature a contemporary sound.

Track listing

Album credits

Personnel
David Foster - keyboards, vocals
Olivia Newton-John - vocal duet on "The Best of Me"
Richard Page - vocals on "Who's Gonna Love You Tonight"
David Boruff - saxophone solos
Chicago horns on "Playing with Fire" - James Pankow, Walter Parazaider, Lee Loughnane
Lee Ritenour - Synthaxe guitar on "Playing with Fire"
Michael Landau - guitars
Tris Imboden - drum overdubs
Carlos Vega - additional drum overdubs
Jerry Hey & David Foster - horn arrangements on "tapDANCE"
Horns on "tapDANCE" - Jerry Hey, Gary Grant, Chuck Findley, Bill Reichenbach Jr., Larry Williams
Gary Herbig - saxophone solo on "tapDANCE"
Gregory Hines - taps on "tapDANCE"
David Boruff, Michael Boddicker, Andrew Thomas, Bo Tomlyn, Will Alexander, Randy Waldman, Marcus Ryle - synthesizer programming

Production
Producers - Humberto Gatica & David Foster
Arrangements - David Foster
Engineer & Mixer - Humberto Gatica
Assistant Engineers - Tommy Vicari, Woody Woodruff, Laura Livingston, Larry Ferguson, Glen Holguin, Rick Holbrook, Claudio Ordenes
Art Direction - Bob Defrin
Design - Jodi Rovin
Photography - Aaron Rapoport
LP mastering - Bernie Grundman
CD mastering - Barry Diament

Charts

References

Liner notes from the album
David Foster - history from FozFan.com

1986 albums
Atlantic Records albums
Albums produced by David Foster
Albums produced by Humberto Gatica